Ezhumalai is a 2002 Indian Tamil-language action drama film directed by Arjun, who also played the titular character. It also features Simran, Gajala and Mumtaj as the female leads, while Vijayakumar and Ashish Vidhyarthi play supporting roles. This film is the Tamil remake of the Telugu film Narasimha Naidu (2001), starring Balakrishna and Simran, where the latter reprised her role in the Tamil version. It was dubbed into Hindi as "Main Hoon Rangbaaz" and despite being a remake of Narasimha Naidu, was dubbed in Telugu as Simha Baludu.  The film released on 21 June 2002.

Plot
Ezhumalai leads a peaceful life as a dance master in the village. Anjali falls in love with him before learning that he has a son and that his wife Lakshmi is dead. She wishes to marry him but faces competition from Lakshmi's sister Sandhya, who also wishes to wed him. Anjali is the daughter of Nagalingam, who is from a neighboring village. When she reveals this fact to Ezhumalai, she learns that he and her father are sworn enemies and that her father was responsible for his families' and Lakshmi's death.

Cast

 Arjun as Ezhumalai
 Simran as Lakshmi
 Gajala as Anjali Nagalingam
 Mumtaj as Sandhya, Lakshmi's sister
 Vijayakumar as Venkatachalam
 Ashish Vidhyarthi as Nagalingam, Anjali's father
 Gowtham Sundararajan as Ezhumalai's elder brother
 Thyagu as Ezhumalai's elder brother
 Sathyapriya as Nagalingam's sister
 Vennira Aadai Moorthy as Marriage Broker
 Chandrasekhar as Venkatachalam's friend
 Anandaraj as Nagalingam's brother in law
 Peeli Sivam as Lakshmi and Sandhya's father
 Charle as Ezhumalai's assistant
 Vaiyapuri as Marriage Broker's assistant
 Keerikkadan Jose as Kalingarayan
 Scissor Manohar as drummer

Soundtrack 
Track listing 
The songs are by Mani Sharma, with lyrics written by Vaali and Thamarai.

Critical reception
Thiraipadam wrote that the film "itself is an age-old revenge tale that offers nothing new and so, the proceedings are predictable, most of the time." The Hindu wrote "The screenplay is Arjun's. So is the direction. And the action hero thrills his fans with stunts aplenty. Yet fights alone, however well choreographed, cannot make a film watchable. You need a well-narrated story — something "Ezhumalai" lacks. Most of the time action waits for no reason and seems to need no logic." Sify wrote that "the film caters strictly to the frontbenchers".

References

2002 films
Tamil remakes of Telugu films
2000s Tamil-language films
Films directed by Arjun Sarja
Films scored by Mani Sharma
Indian action drama films
Indian vigilante films
2000s action drama films
2000s vigilante films